Seyyed Hasan (also Romanized as Seyyed Ḩasan; also known as Seyyed Ḩoseyn) is a village in Elhayi Rural District, in the Central District of Ahvaz County, Khuzestan Province, Iran. At the 2006 census, its population was 163, in 37 families.

References 

Populated places in Ahvaz County